Streptomyces rapamycinicus is a bacterium species from the genus of Streptomyces which has been isolated from soil from the Easter island. Streptomyces rapamycinicus produces sirolimus.

See also 
 List of Streptomyces species

References

Further reading

External links
Type strain of Streptomyces rapamycinicus at BacDive -  the Bacterial Diversity Metadatabase

rapamycinicus
Bacteria described in 2008